was a Japanese mycologist of Hokkaido Imperial University.

Eponymous taxa
Clitocybe imaiana
Imaia
Lactarius imaianus
Stropharia imaiana

Selected publications
Sanshi Imai (1929) "On the Clavariaceae of Japan: I". Transactions of the Sapporo Natural History Society Vol. 11, No. 1, pp. 38–45.
Sanshi Imai (1930) "On the Clavariaceae of Japan: II". Transactions of the Sapporo Natural History Society Vol. 11, No. 2, pp. 70–77.
Sanshi Imai (1931) "On the Clavariaceae of Japan: III. The species of Clavaria found in Hokkaido and Southern Saghalien". Transactions of the Sapporo Natural History Society Vol. 12, No. 1, pp. 9–12.
Sanshi Imai (1932) "Contributions to the knowledge of the classification of the Helvellaceae". Botanical Magazine (Tokyo) 46:544, pp. 172–175.
Sanshi Imai (1932) "Studies on the Hypocreaceae of Japan: I. Podostroma". Transactions of the Sapporo Natural History Society Vol. 12, pp. 114–118.
Sanshi Imai (1933) "Studies on the Agaricaceae of Japan: I. Volvate Agarics in Hokkaido". Botanical Magazine (Tokyo) Vol. 47, No. 558, pp. 423–432.

See also
 :Category:Taxa named by Sanshi Imai

References

Japanese mycologists
Japanese phytopathologists
1900 births
1976 deaths
20th-century Japanese botanists
Academic staff of Hokkaido University
20th-century agronomists